Atteva niveigutta is a moth of the Attevidae family. It is found in Bangladesh, India (Assam), Thailand and possibly China.

The length of the forewings is 13–16 mm. The forewings are lustrous and orange, with about 27 to 53 white dots, some fused to form dashes especially on the distal and dorsal areas, the dots near the costa smaller. The hindwings are orange.

The larvae feed on Ailanthus excelsus.

References 

Moths described in 1854
Attevidae